The Russell Ranch Oil Field is an oil and gas field in the Cuyama Valley of northern Santa Barbara and southern San Luis Obispo Counties, California, in the United States. The primary operator on the field as of 2010 is E&B Natural Resources, which also runs the nearby South Cuyama Oil Field.

Setting
The oil field one of the two significant fields in the Cuyama Valley, the other being the much larger South Cuyama Oil Field. The Russell Ranch field is about seven miles (11 km) west-northwest of the town of New Cuyama. The Cuyama River, and California State Route 166 which parallels the river, cut through the center of the field; travelers on Route 166 have a brief view of oil storage tanks and several pumpjacks, but most of the oilfield operations are out of sight from the public right-of-way.

Terrain consists of an alluvial plain around the river, and grass- and brush-covered hills, cut by numerous gullies and badlands, at both ends of the field in the lower portion of the Caliente and Sierra Madre mountains. Climate is Mediterranean, but modified by the distance from the coast; winters are colder, with occasional freezes, and summertime temperatures sometimes top . Drainage is to the Cuyama River, which flows out to the ocean at Guadalupe. In the vicinity of the oil field, the predominant land use, aside from activities associated with oil production and storage, is cattle grazing. The bottomlands of the Cuyama Valley, adjacent to the field on the east-southeast, are primarily agricultural.

Geology
Unlike many oil fields in central California, the Russell Ranch field is not an anticlinal formation with an obvious surface expression – indeed the geologic formation containing oil is quite invisible from the ground surface, being covered with alluvium and masked by the mountain ranges running almost perpendicular to the oil field.  The oil is in a large homocline, including porous sedimentary units dipping northeast and essentially planar, which terminate at the Russell Fault, a normal fault with an approximately  vertical offset which has barricaded upwards movement of hydrocarbons against impermeable rock of Pliocene age.  The oil-bearing rocks in the homocline – the Santa Margarita and Vaqueros Formations, of late and early Miocene age respectively – are sandstones with a porosity of between 23 and 32 percent.

The oil field has four separate pools or producing horizons within its main area, and one small pool in another area about one-half mile southeast of the main part of the field. The four pools in the main area, all discovered in 1948 and 1949, are the Santa Margarita, in the formation of the same name, of late Miocene age; and the Dibblee, Griggs-Dibblee, and Colgrove, all in the Vaqueros Formation of early Miocene age. The pool in the Southeast Area is also in the Dibblee Sand of the Vaqueros Formation. Sulfur content is generally low, with values from 0.26 to 0.46 percent in each of the pools.

History, production, and operations

The Russell Ranch field was the first to be found in the Cuyama Valley. Prospectors had long suspected the presence of oil there – after all, almost all the surrounding basins were full of oil fields, which only needed to be found by drilling deep enough – but early boreholes found nothing of commercial value. A well drilled in the 1920s near the western edge of the field found nothing, and wells drilled in 1945–6 found traces of oil sands, a promising sign. Norris Oil Company put in the discovery well on January 1, 1948, which produced ; unfortunately the production turned to water quickly, and prospectors began looking for a more favorable location. Richfield Oil Company, an ancestor of ARCO (now BP), put in the well which found the most productive area of the field, drilling to a depth of  into the Dibblee Sand (named for Thomas Dibblee, the geologist who led Richfield to explore for oil in the Cuyama Valley). The success of the Russell Ranch field development led quickly to the discovery of the South Cuyama field about seven miles (11 km) to the southeast, in 1949; this field proved to have over three times the oil of the Russell Ranch field, and remains the largest in the Cuyama Valley.

The field reached its peak production in 1950, when  of oil were withdrawn from the reservoir.  Inevitably, production declined, and field operators employed several enhanced recovery technologies to increase reservoir pressure and keep the wells flowing.  Waterflooding was begun in 1953, and air injection in 1971.  A cyclic steam program ran from 1966 to 1968 but failed to produce any significant benefit.

The field changed hands several times, with West America Resources and J.P. Oil among the owners prior to the purchase by E&B Natural Resources from J.P. Oil in 2003.  E&B, the current operator, reported pumping  of oil in 2008; its wells were averaging only , a figure typical of a field near the end of its useful life.  At the end of 2008, there were 44 wells still active on the field, all operated by E&B.  All but one of these wells was in the Main Area; the other was the solitary well still producing in the Southeast Area.

References

Oil fields in Santa Barbara County, California
Cuyama Valley
Geology of San Luis Obispo County, California
Geography of Santa Barbara County, California
Geography of San Luis Obispo County, California